Heinz Beutler is a former Swiss curler.

He started curling in 1962.

Teams

References

External links
 
 

Living people
Swiss male curlers
Year of birth missing (living people)
Place of birth missing (living people)